Toxopneustes is a genus of sea urchins from the tropical Indo-Pacific. It contains four species. They are known to possess medically significant venom to humans on their pedicellariae (tiny claw-like structures). They are sometimes collectively known as flower urchins, after the most widespread and most commonly encountered species in the genus, the flower urchin (Toxopneustes pileolus).

Species
Species included in the genus are the following:

Gallery

See also
Fire urchin

References

Toxopneustidae
Echinoidea genera
Extant Pliocene first appearances
Taxa named by Louis Agassiz